Jesús María Pereda Ruiz de Temiño (15 June 1938 – 27 September 2011), also known as Chus Pereda, was a Spanish football midfielder and manager.

In a 16-year professional career, he played mainly for Barcelona, amassing La Liga totals of 197 matches and 55 goals for four teams – including Real Madrid. In 1964 he helped Spain win the European Championship, being an international throughout the decade.

After retiring, Pereda was in charge of several Spain youth teams, including the under-20 and the under-21 teams.

Club career
Although born in Medina de Pomar, Province of Burgos, Castile and León, Pereda was raised in Balmaseda in Biscay, and, as a schoolboy, he captained the provincial U-16 team. He began his senior career with Bilbao club SD Indautxu, where his teammates included veteran goalkeeper Raimundo Lezama and Miguel Jones – Pereda and Jones, and later a third player, José Eulogio Gárate, were all controversially rejected by Athletic Bilbao because of their birthplaces, with Pereda moving to Real Madrid and the others to Atlético Madrid.

With the Merengues, Pereda only appeared in two La Liga games, scoring once in a 3–0 home win against Real Zaragoza as the team won the national championship. During his spell in the Spanish capital, he was also loaned to Real Valladolid in Segunda División – after falling out with coach Luis Carniglia– returning to the top flight with Sevilla FC and netting 11 goals in his first season.

Pereda joined FC Barcelona in summer 1961, going on to appear in 293 competitive matches during eight years (104 goals). During that time he won the Copa del Generalísimo twice, scoring the opening goal in the 1963 final, a 3–1 victory over Zaragoza at the Camp Nou.

Aged 31, Pereda left Barcelona and joined Catalonia neighbours CE Sabadell FC, appearing rarely during the top flight season. He closed out his career after two second level campaigns with RCD Mallorca.

In 1995–96, Pereda had his first and only head coaching experience at club level, leading Xerez CD to the 11th position in Segunda División B.

International career
Pereda scored six goals in 15 appearances for Spain, during eight years. His debut was on 15 May 1960 in a 3–0 friendly win with England, at the Santiago Bernabéu Stadium.

Two of Pereda's international goals came at the 1964 European Nations' Cup, in which he appeared alongside Barcelona teammate Josep Maria Fusté. He scored in both the semi-final against Hungary and the final against the Soviet Union, as the national team won the tournament on home soil; in the decisive match he also assisted Marcelino in the 2–1 winner, although No-Do newsreels showed Amancio as the author of the pass.

During 15 years, Pereda managed both the Spain under-20 and under-21 teams, leading the former to the second place in the 1985 FIFA World Championship in the Soviet Union. In 1988, he was in charge of the Castile and León autonomous side for one game, a 1–1 draw with Aragon. Four years later, he replaced Vicente Miera at the helm of the Spain senior team for one match – he worked in his coaching staff as assistant – due to illness.

International goals

Death
Pereda died in Barcelona on 27 September 2011 at the age of 73, from cancer.

Honours

Player

Club
Real Madrid
La Liga: 1957–58
European Cup: 1957–58

Barcelona
Copa del Generalísimo: 1962–63, 1967–68
Inter-Cities Fairs Cup: 1965–66

International
Spain
UEFA European Championship: 1964

Individual
UEFA European Championship: Golden Boot/Team of the Tournament 1964

Manager
Spain U16
UEFA European Championship: 1988

Spain U20
FIFA U-20 World Cup: Runner-up 1985

References

External links
 
 
 FC Barcelona profile
 
 
 

1938 births
2011 deaths
Sportspeople from the Province of Burgos
Spanish footballers
Footballers from Castile and León
Association football midfielders
La Liga players
Segunda División players
SD Indautxu footballers
Real Madrid CF players
Real Valladolid players
Sevilla FC players
FC Barcelona players
CE Sabadell FC footballers
RCD Mallorca players
Spain under-21 international footballers
Spain B international footballers
Spain international footballers
Catalonia international guest footballers
1964 European Nations' Cup players
UEFA European Championship-winning players
Spanish football managers
Segunda División B managers
Xerez CD managers
Spain national under-21 football team managers
Footballers from the Basque Country (autonomous community)
Sportspeople from Biscay
People from Enkarterri